Ijaz Ahmed (born 1 March 1960)  is a former Pakistani first-class cricketer who played for Lahore cricket team. He played 75 First-class and 18 List A cricket matches.

References

1960 births
Living people
Pakistani cricketers
Cricketers from Sahiwal
Lahore cricketers
Punjab (Pakistan) cricketers
Pakistan Universities cricketers
Pakistan Railways cricketers
House Building Finance Corporation cricketers
Income Tax Department cricketers
Multan cricketers